Elections to Rossendale Borough Council were held on 2 May 2019, as part of the wider 2019 UK local elections.

Councillors elected in 2015 were defending their seats this year, and they will be contested again in 2023. The Labour Party retained control of the Council.

State of the Parties
After the election, the composition of the council was:

Election result

Ward results

Cribden

Facit and Shawforth

Greenfield

Greensclough

Hareholme

Healey and Whitworth

Helmshore

Irwell

Longholme

Stacksteads

Whitewell

Worsley

References

2019
2019 English local elections
2010s in Lancashire